Corrado John "Junior" Soprano Jr., portrayed by Dominic Chianese, is a fictional character from the HBO TV series The Sopranos. Usually referred to as "Junior" or "Uncle June,"  he is the official boss of the DiMeo crime family for most of the series. A younger Corrado sometimes appears in flashbacks and is played by Rocco Sisto. Corey Stoll portrays a young Junior Soprano in the 2021 prequel film, The Many Saints of Newark. Dominic Chianese's performance as Junior was universally lauded.

Junior is smart, old-fashioned, stubborn and insecure about his power. Although Junior is portrayed as bitter and deceitful in season one, he shows a more considerate and humorous side of himself in the later seasons and reveals a more sensitive aspect of his personality during his illness and house arrest. According to series creator David Chase the name Junior was taken from one of his own older cousins. Chianese had landed the role of Junior over Tony Sirico who plays Paulie Gualtieri, and Frank Vincent who plays Phil Leotardo.

Background
In season one, it is stated that Junior is 70 years old, placing his birth date in 1928 or 1929. Corrado Soprano, Jr. is the son of Corrado and Mariangela D'Agostino Soprano, who were from Ariano in the Province of Avellino and immigrated to the United States in 1911. Junior is Tony Soprano's uncle: Junior's younger brother is Tony's father Johnny Soprano. He tells the court-ordered psychologist when feigning mental incompetence that he was getting a haircut when he heard about the assassination of John F. Kennedy. 

He tells Tony that he admired John F. Kennedy but did not like his brother Robert because of the latter's involvement with the United States Senate Select Committee on Improper Activities in Labor and Management, as well as the prosecution of Jimmy Hoffa and investigation into the International Brotherhood of Teamsters. Tony fondly recalls how as a child Junior taught him how to play baseball and took him to New York Yankees games. 

Both Junior and Johnny dropped out of high school and turned to a life of organized crime, joining the DiMeo crime family. In the episode "In Camelot", Junior Soprano reveals that he was on a date with Fran Felstein at the 500 Club in Atlantic City, New Jersey to see Enzo Stuarti perform when Fran met his brother Johnny. Junior was in love with Fran and wanted to propose, even buying a ring for her, but could not allow a marriage to affect his status in organized crime, and could not summon the courage to ask her.

Junior always watched over Tony, especially after Johnny's death from emphysema in 1986. Junior guided Tony's ascension in the crime family when Tony took over his father's crew becoming the family's youngest captain.

Following the arrest of longtime boss Ercole "Eckley" DiMeo in late 1995, Junior got into a trucking dispute with new acting boss Jackie Aprile Sr. He fled to Boca Raton to avoid any possible repercussions but Tony and Soprano soldier "Big Pussy" Bonpensiero arranged a meeting to solve the problem. Junior sometimes resented having to answer to the young Aprile, who used to fetch Junior sambucas.

Junior never married and has no children. He lives in Belleville, New Jersey.  He tells Bobby Baccalieri that he has a problem with feet and does not even like talking about bunions.

Plot details
In The Many Saints of Newark, Junior Soprano briefly takes over as caporegime of his brother Giovanni "Johnny Boy" Soprano's crew from 1967 after he is sent to prison. At the funeral of "Hollywood Dick" Moltisanti, the father of Richard "Dickie" Moltisanti, Junior takes Dickie aside and confides in him that he considers them to be brothers. He offers Dickie his hand in friendship and promises to provide any favors he requires. 

Five years later in 1972, Johnny Boy is released from prison and takes back the reins of his crew. To Junior's chagrin, Johnny reprimands him for apparently letting his neighborhood "fall apart" in his absence. Johnny urges his brother to follow Dickie's "example", but this only fractures the once-close relationship that Corrado once held with Dickie; it is clear that  Johnny is beginning to hold Dickie favorably to his brother, who now sees Dickie as a rival, not a partner. 

Sometime later, Junior attends the funeral of Buddha, a made man killed by Harold McBrayer's African-American mob in a gangland hit. Corrado slips down the stairs of the mortuary, and Dickie laughs, who mocks Junior as he struggles to get back onto his feet. Months later, Junior is further frustrated when his injury prevents him from having sex with his comare. Humiliated and enraged, Junior secretly orders a hit on Dickie Moltisanti, knowing it will be blamed on Harold's crew. Moltisanti is shot in the head from behind in the driveway of his home by an unknown assailant. At Moltisanti's own funeral, Corrado stares coldly at his corpse, content with the knowledge that Dickie's death will never come back to him.

In the opening episode of The Sopranos, Junior plans to kill "Little Pussy" Malanga at a restaurant owned by Tony's childhood friend, Artie Bucco. Tony makes many attempts to prevent the murder and eventually resorts to fire bombing the restaurant to force its closure so the hit would happen elsewhere, enraging Junior. Tensions escalate further when two of Tony's criminal associates Christopher Moltisanti and Brendan Filone hijack a truck owned by a Harrison, New Jersey company that pays protection to Junior. Junior constantly expresses outrage and threats over the issue despite Tony's attempts to resolve it. When Brendan hijacks another truck and the driver is accidentally killed, Junior orders Brendan's murder. He spares Christopher's life because he is a surrogate nephew of Tony's, ordering a mock execution instead.

Junior has been waiting a long time to become boss and with his senior rank, feels he is next in line. Upon Jackie's death, Tony has the support to take over the family but fears Junior will start a war if he is not named boss. Tony resolves the situation by letting Junior become boss in order to steer law enforcement attention away from the rest of the family. With the support of the other captains, Tony runs things behind the scenes, especially as Junior becomes greedier and more abusive of his authority. When Junior finds out about this from Tony's own mother he is furious. 

Around this time, Junior's longtime goomah, Bobbi Sanfillipo, inadvertently causes word of Junior's talent for oral sex to spread among the mob wives, eventually reaching Tony, who mocks him in front of several other men. Junior furiously breaks up with Bobbi over this, smashing a lemon meringue pie in her face. He also learns through Livia that Tony is seeing a psychiatrist. All these factors cause Junior to order Tony's failed assassination, which, due to his fondness for Tony, upsets him. Junior vomits while discussing details of the hit and is visibly upset when his associates discuss the hit with him. Tony retaliates by having two of Junior's enforcers, Mikey Palmice and Chucky Signore, murdered. Junior is spared only because the FBI arrests him on racketeering charges.

Junior's acting captain, Philly "Spoons" Parisi, keeps commenting on the conflict between Tony and his uncle and also Livia's involvement, so Tony has him killed. With Junior and his main supporters either in jail or dead, Tony takes full control of the family. He lets Junior keep the title of boss while Tony runs everything as the street boss. Junior is allowed to run his old crew but must give 95% of the proceeds to Tony. Along with a bigger share from his old high-end poker game, union rackets, and car theft ring, this enables Junior to live on a subsistence level, while also making enough to pay his legal fees.

Finally, Tony moves two soldiers from Junior's crew, Patsy Parisi (Philly's twin brother), and Gigi Cestone, over to his own crew. This leaves Junior the senile Murf Lupo as capo, Beppy Scerbo, and Bobby Baccalieri as soldiers.

Soon, Junior is released from jail and placed under house arrest in his Belleville, New Jersey home while awaiting trial, after his attorney convinces the judge that Junior is much sicker than he actually is. While he is under house arrest, Soprano captain Richie Aprile is released from prison after serving ten years, and actively seeks Junior's friendship. Richie wants him and Junior to kill Tony and take over the crime family. 

While Junior wants to take back control, he is cautious of Richie's plans. Junior is conflicted over which side to favor but eventually decides that while Tony can be selfish and impulsive, Richie simply is not respected enough by the rest of the family. Junior tells Tony of Richie's plans against him. Grateful for the warning, Tony increases Junior's take of his former rackets from 5% to 7.5%, and the two (more or less) bury the hatchet.

During this time, Bobby Baccalieri becomes Junior's replacement, right-hand man, and closest confidant. Bobby accompanies Junior on hospital visits during his battles with stomach cancer, which he eventually overcomes. Junior finds various ways to get around his house arrest—using his doctor's office and lawyer's office to conduct business and attending as many funerals and family functions as possible. Despite their disputes, Tony often seeks Junior's advice as the voice of experience. 

In season four, Junior's trial ends in a mistrial after they are able to intimidate one of the jurors into voting not guilty and forcing a hung jury. Although Junior has survived cancer and possible prison time, the toll of a series of 'mini-strokes' and the confinement of house arrest has left him confused, depressed, and in failing health. By season five, Junior starts to show signs of dementia and becomes more dependent for care and support. In "Where's Johnny?", Junior goes wandering the streets in his bathrobe and slippers looking for his deceased brother.

In season six of The Sopranos, Junior's dementia has worsened over the two-year interval, as he becomes paranoid that his long-deceased enemy, "Little Pussy" Malanga, is after him. Tony refuses to put his uncle in a nursing home, feeling obligated to care for Junior himself with the aid of his sisters and Bobby. In the season six debut episode, Tony arrives at Junior's house one evening. Junior, believing his nephew to be Malanga, shoots Tony in the abdomen. Frightened and in a state of panic, Junior runs upstairs, hiding away in his bedroom closet while Tony struggles to dial 9-1-1 before losing consciousness.

Junior is arrested and taken into federal custody over the shooting, but his lawyer secures him a release into a cushy mental institution, claiming he is currently unfit to stand trial. Junior remains confused and distressed by proceedings and denies that he could have deliberately shot his own nephew. Junior's dementia has progressed to such an extreme state that when his great-nephew A.J. Soprano visits him with the intention of killing him as revenge, Junior thinks A.J. is Tony and greets him with excitement. A.J.'s plan is botched when he inadvertently drops the knife on the floor. Tony pulls some strings with former Assemblyman, now State Senator, Ronald Zellman to get A.J. released without charges being filed.

In the Wyckoff therapeutic center, Junior begins to put portions of his old life back together. He still collects weekly payments from his organizations and is occasionally visited by Pat Blundetto and Beppy Scerbo. Within the confines of the mental home, Junior behaves like a typical Mafia chieftain; bribing orderlies, organizing card games, and even physically abusing a rival. A young patient named Carter Chong looks up to Junior as a mentor and father figure and admires his aggressive, imposing, and rebellious nature. 

After Junior loses control of his bladder, the center's administrators conclude that he is not taking his medications. Junior is confronted with the choice of either taking the medication or being moved to a less pleasant facility. Junior agrees to take the medication. He begins to lose his aggressiveness and starts to become more docile. He is badly beaten by his anger-prone protégé, who doesn't want to lose Junior as a mentor. In the final scene of "Remember When" Junior sits passively, black and blue, with broken glasses from his beating, silently sitting and petting a cat sitting on his lap.

In the episode "The Blue Comet", Janice approaches Tony and tells him that Junior has run out of money, and will be removed from the Wyckoff therapeutic center and implores Tony to help him out. Tony shows no sympathy for Junior and offers no support, even spitefully telling Janice that she and Bobby are cut out of his life too, although it is just an empty threat. In the final episode, "Made in America", Junior is moved to a state facility. When Janice goes to visit him, Junior thinks she is her mother Livia and thinks that a picture of Janice's daughter is Janice herself. 

She tries to tell him that Bobby has been murdered, but Junior does not comprehend, thinking she means Bobby Kennedy. Tony later visits a now sick and feeble Junior for the first time since the shooting. Junior now uses a wheelchair. Junior recognizes him as someone he used to play catch with, remembering playing with Tony 40 years earlier. Tony tries to remind Junior of who he was, and even who his brother was, but Junior cannot remember. 

Tony tells him that he and his father used to run North Jersey, to which Junior simply smiles and replies, "Well, that's nice". Tony finally realizes Junior is in an advanced stage of dementia and is saddened and frustrated that Junior is lost for good. Tony simply looks at Junior and then tearfully leaves his uncle for the last time without saying another word.

References

External links
 HBO Profile: Corrado "Junior" Soprano

American male characters in television
Fictional characters from New Jersey
Fictional characters with cancer
Fictional characters with dementia
Fictional crime bosses
Fictional Italian American people
Fictional drug dealers
Fictional gangsters
Fictional murderers
Fictional World War II veterans
Male characters in film
Male villains
Film characters introduced in 2021
The Sopranos characters
Television characters introduced in 1999